Elachista watti is a moth in the family Elachistidae. It was described by Philpott in 1924. It is found in New Zealand.

The wingspan is 7-8.5 mm. The forewings are metallic white with a linear spot of fuscous below the fold at three-fifths and a median fuscous streak from three-fourths to near the apex. The hindwings are greyish-fuscous.

References

Moths described in 1924
watti
Moths of New Zealand
Endemic fauna of New Zealand
Endemic moths of New Zealand